Belle is the fourth studio album by New Zealand singer-songwriter Bic Runga.

The album was released in New Zealand on 14 November 2011, while in Ireland the album was released earlier on 11 November 2011 under Sony Music Ireland.

It is her first studio album in six years and the first to feature a producer, Kody Nielson and material co-written with other songwriters. The album's title is derived from the theme song of the French television series Belle et Sébastien which Runga also covers on the album.

Singles
The first single from the album is "Hello Hello". The track debuted on New Zealand radio stations in September 2011. On 8 September 2011 for a limited time only Bandit.fm allowed fans the chance to download the song for free. On 12 September 2011, "Hello Hello" was made available to purchase from digital music stores in New Zealand. "Tiny Little Piece of My Heart" and "If You Really Do" were released as follow-up singles in 2012.

Track listing
 "Tiny Little Piece of My Heart" (Ruban Nielson, Kody Nielson, Bic Runga) – 2:16
 "Hello Hello" (Bic Runga, Dann Hume) – 3:05
 "If You Really Do" (Bic Runga) – 3:55
 "This Girl's Prepared for War" (Bic Runga, James Milne) – 4:29
 "Everything Is Beautiful and New" (Bic Runga) – 2:59
 "Good Love" (Bic Runga, Dann Hume) – 3:27
 "Devil on Tambourine" (Bic Runga, Kody Nielson) – 3:21
 "Belle" (Cécile Aubry, Tutti) – 1:56
 "Darkness All Around Us" (Kody Nielson) – 3:14
 "Music and Light" (Bic Runga) – 3:38

Weekly charts

Tour
First leg
2011 Classic Hits Acoustic Church Tour

17 November – Whangarei Central Baptist Church
18 November – Tauranga Holy Trinity
19 November – Hamilton Chapel of Christ the King
21 November – Pukekohe Franklin Baptist Church
22 & 23 November – Auckland Holy Trinity Cathedral
25 November – Napier St John's Cathedral
26 November – Palmerston North All Saints Church
28 November – Masterton St Matthew's Anglican Church
29 & 30 November – Wellington Cathedral
2 & 3 December – Christchurch St Michael & All Angels
5 December – Timaru St Mary's Church
6 & 7 December – Dunedin Knox Church
8 December – Invercargill First Presbyterian Church

Second leg
2012 international tour dates – Ireland, UK and Australia

15 April – CORK, The Opera House, Republic of Ireland
17 April – DUBLIN, Olympia Theatre, Republic of Ireland
18 April – LONDON, O2 Shepherd's Bush Empire, United Kingdom
1 May – KANGAROO GROUND, Wellers Restaurant, Australia
2 May – GEELONG, GPAC Drama Theatre, Australia
4 May – MELBOURNE, Athenaeum Theatre, Australia
5 May – BRISBANE, Powerhouse Theatre, Australia
6 May – BANGALOW, A&I Hall, Australia
8 May – CENTRAL COAST,	Lizottes, Australia
9 May – NEWCASTLE, Lizottes, Australia
11 May – WOLLONGONG – IPAC, Gordon Theatre, Australia
12 May – SYDNEY, City Recital Hall, Australia
13 May – CANBERRA, Street Theatre, Australia

References

External links
Bic Runga's official website
New Zealand Herald's album of the year

2011 albums
Bic Runga albums